Bottrop-Vonderort is a railway station in Bottrop, North Rhine-Westphalia, Germany.

The station
The station is located on the Oberhausen-Osterfeld Süd – Hamm railway and is served by a regional service operated by NordWestBahn.

Train services
The following services currently call at Bottrop-Vonderort:

References

DB Website 
Verkehrsgemeinschaft Niederrhein 
STOAG Website 

Railway stations in North Rhine-Westphalia
Railway stations in Germany opened in 1967